Nélia Barbosa (born 8 October 1998) is French paracanoeist. She represented France at the 2020 Summer Paralympics.

Career
Barbosa represented France at the 2021 Canoe Sprint European Championships in the women's KL3 event and won a silver medal.

Barbosa represented France at the 2020 Summer Paralympics in the women's KL3 event and won a silver medal.

References

External links
 

1998 births
Living people
Sportspeople from Lisbon
French female canoeists
ICF Canoe Sprint World Championships medalists in paracanoe
Paracanoeists at the 2020 Summer Paralympics
Medalists at the 2020 Summer Paralympics
Paralympic medalists in paracanoe
Paralympic silver medalists for France